M. taiwanensis may refer to:
 Maackia taiwanensis, a legume species found only in Taiwan
 Macrothele taiwanensis, a mygalomorph spider species in the genus Macrothele
 Methanocalculus taiwanensis, an Archaea species in the genus Methanocalculus
 Myotis taiwanensis, a bat species